This article details the Bradford Bulls rugby league football club's 2015 season, the Bulls 1st season in the Championship.

Season Review

July 2014

Bradford were beaten 52-26 by Huddersfield Giants in Round 21 which confirmed their relegation into the Championship. Following this news Lee Gaskell and Dale Ferguson both signed new deals at the Bulls keeping them at Odsal until the end of the 2016 season. It was announced that loan signing Jamal Fakir would be returning home to France to join Lezignan after his loan expired in the off season. Prop forward Manase Manuokafoa also announced that he would leave the Bulls to play for the Widnes Vikings in the Super League for the 2015 season and onwards, meanwhile scrum half Luke Gale would join the Castleford Tigers to replace Marc Sneyd. Young prop forward Dan Fleming became the Bulls first new signing for 2015 as he signed a 2 Year Deal with Bradford from the Castleford Tigers. The Salford Red Devils out of favour fullback Jake Mullaney became the second new signing for 2015 as he signed a 1 Year Deal with the Bulls. July rounded off with the announcement that prop forward Adam Sidlow had re-signed with the Bulls for another year and home grown second-rower Tom Olbison had signed a new 2 Year Deal.

August 2014

It was announced that Dave Petersen would become James Lowes 3rd new signing for the 2015 season after putting pen to paper on a 1 Year Deal from the Mackay Cutters. Shortly after this news broke it was revealed that Featherstone Rovers winger Etu Uaisele would join the Bulls for the 2015 season. Australian fullback Brett Kearney will return home to Australia after the 2014 season. Young academy hooker Adam O'Brien signed a new 2 Year Deal with the Bulls becoming the 5th person to stay from the 2014 squad. Lowes also revealed that USA Tomahawks forward Mark Offerdahl signed a 1 Year Deal with the club. Youngster James Donaldson left the Bulls to sign a 2 Year Deal at Hull Kingston Rovers however centre Adam Henry re-signed with Bradford for a year. Academy product Danny Addy signed a new 2 Year Deal with Bradford despite interest from several Super League clubs. Veteran player Chev Walker announced that he would stay with Bradford for another year and put pen to paper on a 1 Year Deal. Youngsters Adam Brook and Sam Bates both signed 2 Year contracts with the Bulls keeping them at Odsal until the end of the 2016 season whilst fellow academy products Alex Mellor and Nathan Conroy signed 1 Year Deals. It was announced that Sam Wood would leave the club at the end of the season.

September 2014

September started with the news that on loan winger Danny Williams had signed a permanent 2 Year Deal with the Bulls whilst second row loanee Jay Pitts also signed permanently for the Bulls from Hull F.C. on a 2 Year Deal. During these announcements it was confirmed that Jamie Foster and Elliot Kear would leave the club at the end of the year whilst captain Matt Diskin would retire after a 14-year career. Young Warrington Wolves three-quarter Ryan Shaw signed a 1 Year Deal with the club. Meanwhile coach James Lowes announced another two new signings from Australian side Mackay Cutters, the first being prop Karl Davies on a 2 Year Deal and the second being utility three-quarter Chris Ulugia on a 2 Year Deal. Aussie centre Adrian Purtell re-signed with Bradford on a 1 Year Deal. Young Wakefield Trinity Wildcats scrum half Harry Siejka signed for Bradford on a 2 Year Deal.

October 2014

The fixtures for the 2015 Championship season were released and it was revealed that the Bulls would face Leigh Centurions away in the first round. American international Mark Offerdahl was released from his contract due to being injured but the Bulls have kept his registration in case he recovers well. Ex-assistant coach Karl Harrison returned to Bradford to be James Lowes assistant coach, meanwhile youngster Oliver Roberts left the Bulls to sign a 2 Year Deal with Super League side Huddersfield Giants.

2015 Milestones

Round 1: Jake Mullaney, Etu Uaisele, Harry Siejka, Paul Clough, Chris Ulugia, Lucas Walshaw and Samir Tahraoui made their debuts for the Bulls.
Round 1: Jake Mullaney and Etu Uaisele scored their 1st tries for the Bulls.
Round 1: Harry Siejka kicked his 1st goal for the Bulls.
Round 1: Danny Addy made his 100th appearance for the Bulls.
Round 2: Jean-Philippe Baile and Ryan Shaw made their debuts for the Bulls.
Round 2: Lee Gaskell scored his 2nd hat-trick for the Bulls.
Round 2: Lee Gaskell kicked his 1st goal for the Bulls.
Round 3: Epalahame Lauaki made his debut for the Bulls.
Round 3: Chris Ulugia and Jean-Philippe Baile scored their 1st tries for the Bulls.
Round 3: Ryan Shaw kicked his 1st goal for the Bulls.
Round 4: Daniel Fleming made his debut for the Bulls.
Round 4: Adam O'Brien and Adam Sidlow made their 50th appearances for the Bulls.
Round 4: Ryan Shaw scored his 1st try and 1st hat-trick for the Bulls.
CCR4: Adrian Purtell scored his 1st hat-trick for the Bulls.
CCR4: Samir Tahraoui and Harry Siejka scored their 1st tries for the Bulls.
Round 7: Ryan Shaw reached 100 points for the Bulls.
Round 8: Vila Halafihi made his debut for the Bulls.
Round 8: Danny Addy reached 100 points for the Bulls.
CCR5: Lucas Walshaw scored his 1st try for the Bulls.
Round 10: Lee Gaskell scored his 3rd hat-trick for the Bulls.
Round 10: Paul Clough scored his 1st try for the Bulls.
Round 12: Adrian Purtell scored his 25th try and reached 100 points for the Bulls.
Round 14: Tom Olbison made his 100th appearance for the Bulls.
Round 14: James Mendeika made his debut for the Bulls.
Round 16: James Mendeika scored his 1st try for the Bulls.
Round 16: Danny Williams scored his 1st four-try haul and 1st hat-trick for the Bulls.
Round 20: Jake Mullaney scored his 1st four-try haul and 1st hat-trick for the Bulls.
Round 20: Danny Williams scored his 2nd hat-trick for the Bulls.
Round 21: Omari Caro made his debut for the Bulls.
Round 21: Jake Mullaney scored his 2nd hat-trick for the Bulls.
Round 21: Ryan Shaw kicked his 100th goal for the Bulls.
Round 22: Omari Caro scored his 1st try and 1st hat-trick for the Bulls.
Round 23: James Clare made his debut for the Bulls.
Super Eight's Game 1: Matt Ryan made his debut for the Bulls.
Super Eight's Game 1: James Clare scored his 1st try for the Bulls.
Super Eight's Game 1: Lee Gaskell scored his 4th hat-trick for the Bulls.
Super Eight's Game 1: Lee Gaskell scored his 25th try and reached 100 points for the Bulls.
Super Eight's Game 3: Dane Nielsen made his debut for the Bulls.
Super Eight's Game 3: Jake Mullaney kicked his 1st drop goal for the Bulls.
Super Eight's Game 4: Danny Addy kicked his 50th goal for the Bulls.
Super Eight's Game 6: Danny Williams scored his 25th try and reached 100 points for the Bulls.
Super Eight's Game 6: Danny Addy reached 200 points for the Bulls.
Super Eight's Game 7: Jay Pitts and Adam Henry made their 50th appearance for the Bulls.
Super Eight's Game 7: Matt Ryan scored his 1st try for the Bulls.

Pre Season Friendlies

Bulls score is first.

Player Appearances
Friendly Games Only

 = Injured

 = Suspended

Table
2015 Championship

2015 Super 8 Qualifiers

2015 Fixtures and Results

2015 Championship Fixtures

2015 Super 8 Qualifiers

Million Pound Game
After the Super 8 Qualifiers, Wakefield Trinity Wildcats finished 4th in the table and Championship side Bradford Bulls finished 5th meaning that the two teams would meet in a play-off match to determine who would join Hull Kingston Rovers, Widnes Vikings and Salford Red Devils in next seasons Super League.

Player Appearances
Championship Only

 = Injured

 = Suspended

Challenge Cup

Player Appearances
Challenge Cup Games only

2015 Squad Statistics

 Appearances and points include (Super League, Challenge Cup and Play-offs) as of 3 October 2015.

 = Injured
 = Suspended

2015 Transfers In/Out

In

Out

References

External links
Bradford Bulls Website
Bradford Bulls in T&A
Bradford Bulls on Sky Sports
Red,Black And Amber
BBC Sport-Rugby League 

Bradford Bulls seasons
2015 in rugby league by club
2015 in English rugby league